Cornelius O'Callaghan (1712 – 1781) was an Irish politician.

O'Callaghan served in the Irish House of Commons as the Member of Parliament for Fethard, Tipperary between 1761 and 1768. He then represented Newtownards from 1775 to 1776.

References

1712 births
1781 deaths
Irish MPs 1761–1768
Irish MPs 1769–1776
Cornelius
Members of the Parliament of Ireland (pre-1801) for County Tipperary constituencies
Members of the Parliament of Ireland (pre-1801) for County Down constituencies